Kai Wegner (born 15 September 1972) is a German politician of the Christian Democratic Union (CDU) who served as a member of the Bundestag, the German federal parliament, from 2005 to 2021. In 2019, he became the chairman of the CDU in Berlin.

Early life and education 
Wegner was born 1972 in the Western part of Berlin and became an insurance salesman.

Political career

Member of the German Parliament, 2005–2021 
Wegner joined the CDU already in 1989 and served as vice chair of the party in Berlin from 2000 to 2002.

Wegner was a member of the German Bundestag from the 2005 until 2021, representing Berlin's Spandau district. In parliament, he served on the Committee on Economic Affairs and Energy from 2005 until 2013 before moving to the Committee on Building, Housing, Urban Development and Local Government and the Committee on the Environment, Nature Conservation and Nuclear Safety. In this capacity, he was his parliamentary group's spokesperson on building and housing since 2018.

From 2011 until 2016, Wegner served as secretary general of the CDU in Berlin, under the leadership of chairman Frank Henkel. In May 2019 he succeeded Monika Grütters as chair of the CDU in Berlin.

Member of the State Parliament of Berlin, 2021–present 
In October 2020, Wegner announced his candidacy for Governing Mayor of Berlin in the 2021 state elections; he eventually lost against Franziska Giffey. He has since been serving as his parliamentary group's chairperson and thereby the leader of the opposition.

Wegner was appointed as CDU delegate to the Federal Conventions for the purpose of electing the President of Germany in 2022.

Other activities 
 Foundation for the Humboldt Forum in the Berlin Palace, Member of the Council (since 2018)
 Memorial to the Murdered Jews of Europe Foundation, Member of the Board of Trustees
 Trade Union of the Police (GdP), Member
 Hertha BSC, Member

Political positions 
In June 2017, Wegner voted against his parliamentary group's majority and in favor of Germany's introduction of same-sex marriage.

Ahead of the Christian Democrats' leadership election, Wegner first endorsed in 2020 Friedrich Merz and later Jens Spahn to succeed Annegret Kramp-Karrenbauer as the party's chair. For the 2021 national elections, he later endorsed Markus Söder as the Christian Democrats' joint candidate to succeed Chancellor Angela Merkel.

Personal life 
Wegner lives in Spandau, Berlin. He is Evangelical, divorced, and has two children.

References 

1972 births
Living people
Members of the Bundestag for Berlin
Members of the Bundestag 2013–2017
Members of the Bundestag 2017–2021
Members of the Bundestag 2009–2013
Members of the Bundestag 2005–2009
Members of the Bundestag for the Christian Democratic Union of Germany
People from Spandau